Kõduküla may refer to several places in Estonia:

Kõduküla, Jõgeva County, village in Tabivere Parish, Jõgeva County
Kõduküla, Tartu County, village in Rõngu Parish, Tartu County